Scots Gap is a small village in Northumberland, United Kingdom.

Population 
Scots Gap has approximately 70 private residential dwellings, the oldest dating from the mid 1800s and the latest pair being under construction in 2016.  Private residences in the village are dominated by West Grange Hall and estate, covering some 35 acres across the north-east corner of the village.

Agricultural mart 
The village is best known for the livestock mart which holds weekly sales of prime sheep from June to February and occasional cattle and other sales.  The mart is operated by Hexham and Northern Marts Company and the facility is the largest built structure in the village. The agricultural mart is believed to have been the primary driver behind the opening of the Scots Gap railway station in the 19th century. The railway line and station closed in 1966, though the station building survives.

Facilities 
In addition to West Grange Hall and the agricultural mart, the village offers:

 A country store operated by Robson & Cowan
 A petrol station
 Arkwrights Village Store
 The Scots Gap Methodist Church
 The Scots Gap Medical Group, a GP surgery voted best in the UK in 2016
 The former North East Regional Office of the National Trust, now empty

References

Villages in Northumberland